The Probert Encyclopaedia is a defunct online encyclopedia containing over 110,000 entries organized topically, written and published by Matthew Probert under the name Probert Publishing. It has unusual search functions which create pages containing the text of all the articles matching the search, rather than giving a list of results.

The Probert Encyclopaedia was first published in 1993 as a knowledgebase for artificial intelligence systems and has subsequently been developed to include the topics omitted by other encyclopaedias. It was available as downloadable freeware until the 18th edition, published in December 1998, when Probert reserved the rights of distribution after finding people had reproduced his work on their privately owned websites, without permission.

The encyclopedia is offline as of February 2015.

See also
Lists of encyclopedias
List of online encyclopedias

External links 
The Probert Encyclopaedia Internet Archive.

Saved pages showing its search results page Internet Archive.

References 

British online encyclopedias